Korean Paralympics may refer to:

 1988 Summer Paralympics, held in Seoul, South Korea
 2018 Winter Paralympics, held in PyeongChang, South Korea
 South Korea at the Paralympics (IPC code: KOR), Republic of Korea
 North Korea at the Paralympics (IPC code: PRK), People's Democratic Republic of Korea

See also
 Korean Olympics (disambiguation)